Back 2 Basics is the third album by hip hop duo Sway & King Tech. The album was released in 2005 for Bungalo Records and was produced by DJ Revolution.  The album was not as successful as their previous album This or That, not making it on any charts. However the album spawned the semi-successful single "I Don't Think So".  Guests include RZA, Chino XL, Crooked I, MC Juice & Royce da 5'9".

Track listing 
 "Intro" feat. RZA- 2:34 
 "Everything"  feat. Sly Boogy - 4:09 
 "Watch Closer" feat. Chino XL & Tracy Lane - 3:57 
 "I Wish U Would" feat. Royce Da 5'9", Canibus & Chino XL- 4:23
 "Ill Hip Hop" feat. MC Juice- 4:27 
 "Thoughts on How to Make a Good Album" - 0:59 
 "I Don't Think So" feat. Kam- 4:30 
 "Enough Beef" feat. Royce da 5'9", Common & Chino XL- 4:13 
 "Port-O-Posse" feat. KutMasta Kurt - 2:53 
 "We Don't Give A..." feat. Kallihan & Hellraiza - 3:40 
 "Watch What You Do" feat. Crooked I - 4:35 
 "Wake Up Show Anniversary" feat. Chino XL - 3:24 
 "Trouble" feat. Chino XL & Tracy Lane - 4:09 
 "23 Degrees" feat. Dirty Birdy - 4:54 
 "Wack Detector" feat. KutMasta Kurt - 1:45 
 "Better Days" feat. Self Scientific & Tracy Lane - 4:20 
 "High Fidelity" feat. DJ Revolution - 3:56 
 "Hands to the Sky" feat. Verb & Rock - 3:54 
 "I Love the Ghetto" feat. Crooked I & Tracy Lane - 4:18 
 "Hit the Deck" feat. Crooked I - 3:38

References

Sway & King Tech albums
2005 albums
Albums produced by DJ Khalil
Albums produced by Focus...